John Hansen Sørbrøden (3 May 1775 – 8 December 1857) was a Norwegian farmer, lay preacher and politician.

He was born of the Sørbrøden in Berg parish in Østfold, Norway. He grew up within a farm family which figured prominently in the Haugean Movement (haugianere). The family farm became a Haugean center in the area.

He represented Smaalenene (now Østfold) at the Norwegian Constituent Assembly at Eidsvoll in 1814, and was elected member of the Parliament of Norway from 1833.

References

1775 births
1857 deaths
Norwegian farmers
Fathers of the Constitution of Norway